James William Jones (born October 5, 1894) was an American college football and basketball player and coach. He served as the head football coach at Austin College in 1915 and at Sam Houston State University form 1923 to 1935, compiling a career college football coaching recordof 57–57–12. Jones was also the head basketball coach at Sam Houston State from 1922 to 1936, and the school's athletic director during the same span.

Head coaching record

College football

References

1894 births
Year of death missing
Austin Kangaroos football coaches
Basketball coaches from Texas
Illinois Fighting Illini football players
Sam Houston Bearkats athletic directors
Sam Houston Bearkats football coaches
Sam Houston Bearkats men's basketball coaches
Washington & Jefferson Presidents football players
High school football coaches in Texas
People from Whitesboro, Texas